The Codman–Davis House is a four-story, red brick, 1906, classical revival house in Washington, D.C. at 2145 Decatur Place NW (in the Kalorama neighborhood). It was designed by Ogden Codman Jr. for his cousin, Martha Codman of Washington, DC and Newport, Rhode Island. She also commissioned his design of the Codman Carriage House and Stable, built nearby.

It is listed on the National Register of Historic Places.  In 1995 the house served as the residence of the Thai ambassador.

See also
 Codman Carriage House and Stable

References

External links
 

Houses completed in 1906
Diplomatic residences in Washington, D.C.
Neoclassical architecture in Washington, D.C.
Houses on the National Register of Historic Places in Washington, D.C.
Thailand–United States relations
1906 establishments in Washington, D.C.